Rosie Eccles (born 23 July 1996) is a British amateur boxer who is affiliated with Pontypool ABC.

She won silver medals at the 2016 Women's European Amateur Boxing Championships and the 2018 Commonwealth Games.

In May 2019, Eccles was selected to compete at the 2019 European Games in Minsk, Belarus. She also competed at the 2019 World Championships in Ulan-Ude, Russia, where she lost by unanimous decision to Yang Liu in the round of 16.

References

External links
 "Rosie Eccles: From boxercise to the World Champs"
 "Commonwealth Games: Wales' Rosie Eccles will face England's Sandy Ryan in 69kg final"
 

Living people
Welsh women boxers
Commonwealth Games medallists in boxing
Commonwealth Games silver medallists for Wales
Boxers at the 2018 Commonwealth Games
1996 births
European Games competitors for Great Britain
Boxers at the 2019 European Games
Welterweight boxers
Medallists at the 2018 Commonwealth Games